Valerie Viehoff (born 16 February 1976 in Bonn) is a German rower.

References 
 
 

1976 births
Living people
German female rowers
Sportspeople from Bonn
Olympic rowers of Germany
Rowers at the 2000 Summer Olympics
Olympic silver medalists for Germany
Olympic medalists in rowing
World Rowing Championships medalists for Germany
Medalists at the 2000 Summer Olympics
20th-century German women
21st-century German women